Hartwood Airport is a former airport located in Fredericksburg, Virginia, United States. It was opened in 1969, and closed in 2010.

During the time it was active, it's FAA and ICAO airport codes were 8W8.

Hartwood Airport straddles a county border with its street address in Stafford County, Virginia and its hangar, office, and most of its runway in Fauquier County, Virginia.

It was popular for private pilot training and its parachute drop zone.

References 

Buildings and structures in Stafford County, Virginia
Defunct airports in Virginia
Transportation in Stafford County, Virginia
Airports established in 1969
1969 establishments in Virginia
Airports disestablished in 2010
2010 disestablishments in Virginia